Formula One Management has awarded three different promotional awards, the Television Trophy for the best host broadcaster, the Race Promoters' Trophy for the best race promoter and the ASN Trophy (also called Bernie Ecclestone Trophy) for the best-scoring national sporting association. In 2007 only the Race Promoters' and ASN Trophies were awarded, leaving the TV Trophy out. This may be because the FOM World Feed is now the main broadcaster for almost all races.

Previously, the Race Promoters' Trophy was awarded by the Formula One Constructors Association (FOCA) as the FOCA Award. Therefore, FOCA's name still remains in the main body of the trophy for race promoters.

Race Promoters' Trophy

By season

By Grand Prix

By circuit

Television Trophy

The Television Trophy is awarded to the host broadcaster voted by all the other host broadcasters for having produced the best coverage of an event during the Formula One season.

ASN Trophy
The ASN Trophy is awarded to the national sporting association with the most driver points during the season.

Notes

References

 Trophy: there are names of winners (1975–1982 and 2003, 1983–1994 1995–1998, 1999–2002)
 FIA Official website
 2003 winner, 2004 winner, 2005 winner
 Press release: 2006 winner
 Press release: 2007 winner
 Press release: 2008 winner
 Press release: 2009 winner
 Press release: 2010 winner
 Press release: 2011 winner

Promotional Trophy